Tineo (Asturian Tinéu) is a concejo (municipality) in the Principality of Asturias, Spain. It is situated on a small tributary of the Narcea River. It is the second-largest municipality in Asturias. It is bordered to the north by Valdés, to the south by Cangas del Narcea, to the west by Villayón and Allande, and to the east by Salas, Belmonte de Miranda and Somiedo.

Mining, agriculture and stock-rearing have been the principal industries since the early 20th century.

History

Coat of Arms 
Top left, Castle Tineo
Top right, Coat of Arms from García de la Plaza, the local Heroe
Bottom left, Coat of Arms by the Cistercians Monastery in Castilla 
Bottom right unten, Coat of Arms by the Franciscans in the Monastery of Tieno
middle, das  Coat of Arms from the Count  of Tineo

Way of St. James 
The Way of St. James or Camino de Santiago named "The Northern Way" (Camino de la Costa) Camino Primitivo passes Luarca. There are also two Pilgrim Heritages:
 Albergue de Peregrinos «Mater Christi» - Marco Rodríguez, s/n - 33870 - Tineo (20 Beds)
 Albergue de Peregrinos «Tineo» - C/ Cabezas de San Juan - 33870 Tineo.

Demography

Politics

Parroquias (Parishes)

Tourism

The Sacred Art Museum of Tineo is located at the Plaza Alonso Martinez inside the Convento de San Francisco del Monte ("Convent of San Francisco del Monte"), a 14th-century Roman Catholic church accessible via the AS-217 road.

References

External links
Ayuntamiento de Tineo (in Spanish) 
Palacio de Meras Hotel & Spa ****  - Meras Palace Hotel & Spa **** Tineo Monumental (in Spanish)
Tineo Nature images (in Spanish)

Municipalities in Asturias
Towns in Asturias